Motherland: Tales of Wonder is a Canadian documentary film, directed by Helene Klodawsky and released in 1994. The film centres on interviews with a variety of women, both older women whose children are now adults and younger women who were still raising young kids at the time the film was made, about the social and cultural pressures attached to motherhood.

The film received a Genie Award nomination for Best Feature Length Documentary at the 16th Genie Awards in 1996.

References

External links
 

1994 films
1994 documentary films
Canadian documentary films
Documentary films about women
National Film Board of Canada documentaries
1990s English-language films
1990s Canadian films